Koubia (Pular: 𞤑𞤵𞤦𞤭𞤴𞤢𞥄) is a town located in northwestern Guinea. It is the capital of Koubia Prefecture.
Population 2,486 (2008 est).

References

Sub-prefectures of the Labé Region